Jeanne Eagels (born Eugenia Eagles; June 26, 1890 – October 3, 1929) was an American stage and film actress. A former Ziegfeld Girl, Eagels went on to greater fame on Broadway and in the emerging medium of sound films. She was posthumously nominated for the Academy Award for Best Actress for her 1929 role in The Letter after dying suddenly that year at the age of 39.

Early life
Eugenia Eagles was the second of six children born to Edward, of German and French Huguenot descent, and his wife Julia Eagles (née Sullivan), who was of Irish descent. Her birth year – depending on the source – is given as 1888, 1890 (official bio year), 1891, 1892,  1893 (death certificate), or 1894. Jeanne, who later changed the spelling of her surname to "Eagels", would later claim that her father was a Spanish architect and she was born in Boston. In reality, she was born in Kansas City, Missouri and her father was a carpenter. 

Eagels attended St. Joseph's Catholic School and Morris Public School. She quit school shortly after her First Communion to work as a cash girl in a department store.

Career
Eagels began her acting career at a young age in Kansas City, appearing in a variety of small venues. She left Kansas City around the age of 15 and toured the midwestern U.S. with the Dubinsky Brothers' traveling theater show as a dancer. She later played the leading lady in several comedies and dramas put on by the Dubinskys. As a teenager, she married Morris Dubinsky, who frequently played a villain.

Around 1911, she moved to New York City, working in chorus lines and eventually becoming a Ziegfeld Girl. Her hair was brown, but she bleached it when she went to New York. During this period, one of her acting coaches was Beverley Sitgreaves. She was in the supporting cast of Mind the Paint Girl at the Lyceum Theatre in September 1912.  Eagels played opposite George Arliss in three plays in 1916 and 1917.
 
In 1915, she appeared in her first motion picture. She also made three films for Thanhouser Film Corporation in 1916–17. In 1918, she appeared in Daddies, a David Belasco production. She quit this show due to illness and subsequently traveled to Europe. She appeared in several other Broadway shows between 1919 and 1921.

In 1922, she had her first starring role, in the play Rain by John Colton and  Clemence Randolph, based on a short story by W. Somerset Maugham. In this, her favorite role, Eagels played Sadie Thompson, a free-wheeling and promiscuous spirit who confronts a fire-and-brimstone preacher on a South Pacific island. She went on tour with Rain for two more seasons and returned to Broadway to give a farewell performance in 1926.

In 1926, Eagels was offered the part of Roxie Hart in Maurine Dallas Watkins's  play Chicago, but she walked out during rehearsals. She next appeared in the comedy Her Cardboard Lover (1927) with Leslie Howard, touring for several months. After missing a few performances due to ptomaine poisoning, Eagels returned to the cast in July 1927 for an Empire Theater show.

After a season on Broadway, she took a break to make a movie. She appeared opposite John Gilbert in the MGM film Man, Woman and Sin (1927), directed by Monta Bell. In 1928, after failing to appear for a performance in Milwaukee, Wisconsin, Eagels was banned from the stage for 18 months by Actors Equity. The ban did not stop Eagels from working in film, and she made two sound films for Paramount Pictures: The Letter and Jealousy (both released in 1929).

Personal life
Eagels was married twice. Her first marriage was to actor Morris Dubinsky whom she married when she was a teenager. The couple reportedly had a son who either died (causing Eagels to have a nervous breakdown) or who was given up for adoption after the couple separated. Eagels and Dubinsky eventually divorced. In August 1925, Eagels married Edward Harris "Ted" Coy, a former football star at Yale University who became a stockbroker. They had no children and divorced in July 1928.

Death and legacy
During the peak of her success, Eagels began abusing drugs and alcohol and eventually developed an addiction. She went to several sanatoriums in an effort to kick her dependency. By the mid-1920s, she had begun using heroin. When she entered her 30s, Eagels began suffering from bouts of ill health that were exacerbated by her excessive substance abuse.

In September 1929, Eagels underwent eye surgery at St. Luke's Hospital in New York City. At the time, she was also suffering from breathing problems and neuritis. After a ten-day stay, Eagels returned to her apartment on Park Avenue. On October 3, 1929, Eagels and her secretary walked to the Park Avenue Hospital where Eagels had an appointment. While talking to the doctor, she began having convulsions and died shortly thereafter. The assistant chief medical examiner who performed Eagels' autopsy concluded that she died of "alcoholic psychosis". The medical examiner stated that while Eagels had not consumed alcohol in the two days preceding her death, she had been "acting strangely" and suffering from hallucinations three or four days before she died. Toxicology reports revealed that Eagels still had alcohol in her organs when she died in addition to heroin and chloral hydrate (a sedative that Eagels regularly took to sleep). Her death was attributed to an overdose of the chloral hydrate.

After services in New York at the Frank E. Campbell Funeral Chapel, Eagels received a second funeral service when her body was returned to Kansas City on October 7, where she was buried in Calvary Cemetery. She was survived by her mother Julia Eagles and several brothers and sisters.

Eagles was nominated posthumously for Best Actress for her role in The Letter at the 2nd Academy Awards in 1930. She was the first performer to be nominated by the Academy after her death, though hers, like all the nominations at the 2nd Academy Awards, was unofficial, being among several actresses "under consideration" by a board of judges.
 
In 1957, a mostly fictionalized film biography entitled Jeanne Eagels was made by Columbia Pictures, with Eagels portrayed by Kim Novak. Eagels' family sued Columbia over the way Eagels had been depicted in the movie.

Filmography

See also
List of actors with Academy Award nominations

References
 1900 United States Federal Census, Kansas City, Jackson County, Missouri, June 4, 1900, ED 111, p. 5.
 1910 United States Federal Census, Kansas City Ward 9, Jackson County, Missouri, Enumeration District 111.
 Blum, Daniel (1952). Great Stars of the American Stage. Page 80.
 Kansas City Star, Edward W. Eagles Mortuary Notice, February 15, 1910.
 Kansas City Star  "Another Kansas City Girl 'Arrives' October 5, 1913 Page 15
 Kansas City Post "Jeanne Eagles passes up Wales to play 'Rain" before mother"  April 10, 1925 p. 29
 New York Times, "This Week To See Rush Of New Plays", September 8, 1912, Page X4.
 New York Times, "Jeanne Eagels Playing Again", July 13, 1927, Page 20.
 New York Times, "The Vacillating Vampire", December 5, 1927, Page 26.

Footnotes

External links

 
 Jeanne Eagels tribute site (archived)
 
 Jeanne Eagels photographs at New York Public Library Digital Collections

1890 births
1929 deaths
20th-century American actresses
Actresses from Kansas City, Missouri
Alcohol-related deaths in New York City
American film actresses
American people of German descent
American people of Irish descent
American silent film actresses
American stage actresses
Drug-related deaths in New York City
Ziegfeld girls